This is a list of medical schools in Zambia.

|7||Mulungushi University, School of Medicine and Health Sciences||Livingstone ||Mulungushi University, School of Medicine and Health Sciences||MBChB<ref>

See also
 List of universities in Zambia
 Education in Zambia

References

 01
Zambia
Medical schools